The 1931–32 season saw Rochdale compete for their 11th season in the Football League Third Division North where they finished in 21st position with 11 points.

Rochdale finished bottom of the Third Division North after managing just four wins. During the season they went on a record-breaking run of 17 straight defeats.

Statistics

     
  

          

|-

|}

Final league table

Competitions

Legend

Football League Third Division North

FA Cup

Lancashire Cup

Manchester Cup

References

External links
 Up the Dale 1931–32
 Rochdale 1931–32 at Soccerbase.com (select relevant season from dropdown list)

Rochdale A.F.C. seasons
Rochdale